In fire protection, an accelerant is any substance or mixture that accelerates or speeds the development and escalation of fire. Accelerants are often used to commit arson, and some accelerants may cause an explosion. Some fire investigators use the term "accelerant" to mean any substance that initiates and promotes a fire without implying intent or malice.

A fire is a self-sustaining, exothermic oxidation reaction that emits heat and light. When a fire is accelerated, it can produce more heat, consume the reactants more quickly, burn at a higher temperature, and increase the spread of the fire. An accelerated fire is said to have a higher "heat release rate," meaning it burns more quickly.

Fire investigation

Indicators of an incendiary fire or arson can lead fire investigators to look for the presence of accelerants in fire debris. Accelerants can leave behind evidence of their presence and use. Accelerants present in areas they should not be can indicate an incendiary fire or arson. Investigators often use special dogs known as accelerant detection canines trained to smell ignitable liquids. The dog can pinpoint areas for the investigator to collect samples. Fire debris submitted to forensic laboratories employ sensitive analytical instruments with GC-MS capabilities for forensic chemical analysis.

Types of accelerants
Many accelerants are hydrocarbon-based fuels, sometimes referred to as petroleum distillates: gasoline, diesel fuel, kerosene, turpentine, butane, isopropyl alcohol, Lacquer, Methyl alcohol, and various other flammable solvents. These accelerants are also known as ignitable liquids. Ignitable liquids can leave behind tell-tale marks in the fire debris. These irregular burn patterns can indicate the presence of an ignitable liquid in a fire.

The properties of some ignitable liquids make them dangerous accelerants. Many ignitable liquids have high vapor pressures, low flash points and a relatively wide range between their upper and lower explosive limit. This allows ignitable liquids to ignite easily, and when mixed in a proper air-fuel ratio, readily explode. Many arsonists who use generous amounts of gasoline have been seriously burned or killed igniting their fire.

Available combustibles

Common household items and objects can accelerate a fire. Wicker and foam have high surface to mass ratios and favorable chemical compositions and thus burn easily and readily. Arsonists who use large amounts of available combustible material rather than ignitable liquids try to avoid detection. Using large fuel loads can increase the rate of fire growth as well as spread the fire over a larger area, thus increasing the amount of fire damage. Inappropriate amounts and types of fuel in a particular area can indicate arson. Whether available combustible materials constitute an accelerant depends on the intent of the person responsible for their use.

Sales of certain accelerants are limited to the particular group allowed to purchase them for trainings and fire demolitions (to train new firefighters).

References

Firefighting
Arson